The following is a timeline of the history of Delhi, including New Delhi. Changes in ruling nation are in bold, with a flag to represent the country where available.

Kuru Kingdom (1200 BCE-500 BCE) 

 Territory came under the Kuru Kingdom.

Maurya Empire (300 BCE-100 BCE) 

 Territory came under the Maurya Empire.

Kushan Empire (1st-3rd century) 

 Territory came under the Kushan Empire.

Gupta Empire (3rd century-6th century) 

 Territory came under the Gupta Empire under the Yaudheya consortium.

Vardhana Dynasty (6th century-7th century)

Gurjara-Pratihara Dynasty (7th century) 

 Territory briefly came under the Gurjara-Pratihara Dyansty.

Tomara Dynasty (731-1160) 

731/736 – Lal Kot founded by the Tomara dynasty.

Chahamanas of Shakambhari (1160-1206) 
 – Chauhan rulers take Lal Kot from the Tomars.
1180 – Lal Kot renamed to Rai Pithora.
1191 – First Battle of Tarain, the Chauhans under Prithviraj Chauhan defeated the Ghurid empire.
1192 – Second Battle of Tarain, Delhi sacked by Muhammad Ghori.

Delhi Sultanate (1206 – 1526)

The Delhi Sultanate refers to 5 Muslim Kingdoms which were based mostly in Delhi for 320 years. They are:

1206 -1290 –Early Turkish Rulers / Slave Dynasty or Mamluk Dynasty  Qutb-ud-din Aibak becomes first Sultan of Delhi in 1206. Delhi is the capital.
1290-1320 – Khalji Dynasty   Jalal-ud-din becomes first sultan of Khalji Dynasty in 1290
1320 -1413 – Tughlaq Dynasty (1320 -1413) Ghazi Malik ascended the throne under the title of Ghiyas-ud-din Tughlaq in 1320
1414-1451 – Sayyid Dynasty   Khizr Khan ascended the throne in 1414
1451 - 1526 – Lodi Dynasty  Bahlul Lodhi captured Delhi and became Sultan in 1451

Mughal Empire (1526 – 1857)
1526 –  Mughal Empire: The First Battle of Panipat creates the Mughal Empire, centered at Agra and Delhi.
1556 – Second Battle of Panipat, and Mughals retake Delhi from Suri dynasty.
1639 – Shahjahanbad (Old Delhi) is founded by Mughal emperor Shah Jahan.
1737 – First Battle of Delhi, where Mughal Delhi is sacked by Marathas.
1753 – Jat ruler Suraj Mal plundered Delhi.

Durrani Empire (1752-1764) 
1752 - Delhi became a protectorate state of Durrani Empire.
1761 - Durranis defeated Marathas in Third battle of Panipat and captured Delhi. The Mughal Emperor became vassal ruler and paid tributes to the Durranis.

Maratha Empire (1757-1803) 
1757 – : Battle Of Delhi (1757), Marathas defeat Rohilla Pathans and capture Delhi.
1771 – Delhi is captured by Mahadji Shinde and the emperor paid tribute to Marathas.

Sikh Misls (1765-1799) 
1764 – Jats and Sikhs lay siege to Delhi for several months and defeat Rohillas.
1768 - After defeating Najib-ud-Daulah, Sikhs marched into Delhi.
1783 – Sikhs defeat the Mughals at the outskirts of Delhi and capture the Red Fort. Sikhs controlled the capital for a year where the Mughal emperor paid 37.5 percent of the tax revenue.

British Empire (1803 – 1947)
1803 –  Company Rule: Battle of Delhi between the Marathas and British East Indian Company.
1804 – Siege of Delhi by Marathas.
1857 – Indian Rebellion of 1857 begins in several cities, including Delhi.
1858 –  British Raj
1911 – Delhi is once again the capital of the British Raj.
1927 – New Delhi founded.
1931 – New governmental quarter of Delhi inaugurated by architect Edwin Lutyens. It is called Lutyens' Delhi.

India (1947 – present)
1947 –  Dominion of India: New Delhi becomes the capital of India.
1950 – 
1956 – Delhi is made into a Union Territory.
1991 – Delhi is formally made into a National Capital Territory.
1996 – Lajpat Nagar Market Blast kills 13 people and injures 39.
2001
13 December: 2001 Indian Parliament attack takes place.
Population: 13,782,976 
2002 – Delhi Metro begins operation.
2005 – Delhi bombings kill 62 people and injure at least 210.
2008 – More than 35 killed and 150 injured during the 13 September 2008 Delhi bombings and 27 September 2008 Delhi bombings.
2010 – Delhi hosts the Commonwealth Games
2011 – Population: 16,753,235 
2011 – At least 15 people are killed and 79 injured in the 2011 Delhi bombing.
2012
 13 February: 2012 attacks on Israeli diplomats in Delhi, part of the Iran–Israel proxy conflict.
29 March: 4th BRICS summit takes place.
2014
 14 February: Politician Arvind Kejriwal resigns from the post of Chief Minister.
2015
 7 February: Aam Aadmi Party wins the 2015 Delhi Legislative Assembly election.
2019
 Shaheen Bagh Protests oppose the passage of the Citizenship (Amendment) Act, 2019.
 8 December: 2019 Delhi factory fire.
2020
 5 January: 2020 Jawaharlal Nehru University attack occurs, with the attackers unknown.
 8 February: Aam Aadmi Party wins the 2020 Delhi Legislative Assembly election.
 23 February–29 February: 2020 Delhi riots incur communal violence in response to the Shaheen Bagh protest.
 2 March: The COVID-19 pandemic in Delhi begins, soon leading to a lockdown.
 30 November: Ten thousand farmers from different states of India (including Punjab, Haryana and Uttar Pradesh) arrived at the outskirts of New Delhi to mark protest against deregulation rules.
2021
29 January: Israeli Embassy in Delhi is attacked with Iran refuting allegations of purporting the attack.

References

Notes

External links

History of Delhi
delhi
Timelines of capitals
Delhi